Hamar Weyne District is a district in the southeastern Banaadir region of Somalia. It includes a part of central Mogadishu. Hamar Weyne is the oldest district with in Mogadishu and up until 1938 the city of Mogadishu was made up of Shingani and Hamar Weyne.Somali word "xamar" means tamarind tree.

Mosques 

Despite being one of the smallest districts in Mogadishu, the Hamar Weyne district is known for it many mosques and madrasahs. There are over 25 mosques in this district, which include:

 'Abdulkadir 
'Adayga (Aw Musse)
 'Ano Qube (Raqayga)
 Aw Dhawariyo
 Aw Haji Bawasan
Aw Mukhtar & Aw Sheikh Omar (The Twin Mosques)
 Aw Osman Hassan
Awooto Eeday
 Fakhrudiin
 Faraj Bin 'Ali
 Haji Abati Shoble
 Haji 'Ali Abow Hussenka
Jama'a Xamar Weyne
 Jaama‟ Marwas
Mohamed Al Tani
 Nuruleyn (Sharif Aghil)
 Pakistan Mosque
 Sharif Hashim
 Sheikh Aweys
 Sheikh Uweys ul Qarni
 Sheikh Ibrahim
 Sheikh Idris
Sheikh Rumani Ba 'Alawi

References

Districts of Somalia
Administrative map of Hamar Weyne District

Districts of Somalia
Banaadir